Ancistrus brevifilis is a species of catfish in the family Loricariidae. It is a freshwater fish native to South America, where it occurs in the Tuy River basin in Venezuela. The species reaches 11.8 cm (4.6 inches) SL.

References 

brevifilis
Fish described in 1920